Hurmudar-e Bala (also Romanized as Hūrmūdār-e Bālā and Hūrmūdar Bāla; also known as Hormūdar, Hormūdar-e Bālā, and Hūrmūdār) is a village in Fin Rural District, Fin District, Bandar Abbas County, Hormozgan Province, Iran. At the 2006 census, its population was 28, in 7 families.

References 

Populated places in Bandar Abbas County